Yergüc (also, Yergyuch, Yerkyuch, Yergyudzh, Ot-Yerguch, Borispol, and Barispol) is a village and municipality in the Khachmaz Rayon of Azerbaijan.  It has a population of 3,444.  The municipality consists of the villages of Yergüc, Bayoba, Üçgünqışlaq, and Sərkərlı.

References 

Populated places in Khachmaz District